Maria Thompson is an American scientist and academic administrator who served as the 7th president of Coppin State University. She was the first female president.

Early life and education 
Maria Thompson is from Nashville, Tennessee. She completed a bachelor's degree at Tennessee State University (TSU). She earned a Master of Science in textiles at Ohio State University. Thompson completed a doctorate in textile science and textile economics at the University of Tennessee.

Career 
Thompson held research administration positions at TSU for 13 years. She was the TSU vice president for research and sponsored programs before transferring to the State University of New York at Oneonta to serve as provost and vice president for academic affairs for 4 years.

Thompson became the 7th president of Coppin State University on July 1, 2015. She is the female president of the university. After recovering from cancer, she resigned from her position in June 2019.

Personal life 
Thompson is a cancer survivor. She married her long-term partner, Joseph Perry, in December 2018. She resides in Nashville.

See also 

 List of women presidents or chancellors of co-ed colleges and universities

References 

Living people
21st-century American women scientists
American academic administrators
Women heads of universities and colleges
Textile scientists
Scientists from Tennessee
Tennessee State University alumni
Tennessee State University faculty
Ohio State University alumni
University of Tennessee alumni
State University of New York at Oneonta faculty
Coppin State University faculty
People from Nashville, Tennessee
Year of birth missing (living people)
Heads of universities and colleges in the United States
African-American women academics
American women academics
African-American academics
21st-century African-American women
21st-century African-American scientists